J. H. Hobbs, Brockunier and Company was one of the largest and best known manufacturers of glass in the United States in the 19th century.  Its products were distributed world-wide.  The company is responsible for one of the greatest innovations in American glassmaking—an improved formula for lime glass that enabled American glass makers to produce high-quality glass at a lower cost.  The firm also developed many of the talented glassmakers that started glass factories in Ohio and Indiana. 
 
The firm was first organized as Barnes and Hobbs in 1845 by James B. Barnes and John L. Hobbs.  Both men held supervisory positions at the New England Glass Company in Massachusetts before starting their business venture.  They came to a small community near the south side of Wheeling, Virginia, to begin their new glassmaking company.  The firm was reorganized multiple times during the next half century, but members of the Hobbs family were always part of the ownership.  The most famous iteration of the company was named J. H. Hobbs, Brockunier and Company.  This version of the firm was organized in 1863 as a co-partnership between John L. Hobbs, son John H. Hobbs, and Charles W. Brockunier.  Its products were mostly pressed and blown tableware.

In 1891, the Hobbs glass works joined the United States Glass Company trust.  The trust controlled over a dozen glass plants.  In 1893, the glass works was closed.  It remained closed until 1902 when the property was sold to Harry Northwood—a former employee of J. H. Hobbs, Bruckunier and Company.

Wheeling

A good transportation system made Wheeling an ideal location for a glass factory during the 19th century.  Wheeling is located on the Ohio River at the river's intersection with the National Road.  During the 1840s, waterways were the best mode for inter-city transportation.  America's railroad network was still in its infancy, especially west of the Appalachian Mountains.  The Ohio and Mississippi Rivers were an easy way to ship products to large cities such as Cincinnati, Louisville, St. Louis, and New Orleans.

Glassmaking required high quantities of fuel to melt the raw materials used to make glass.  Coal was the fuel of choice for making glass during much of the 19th century, succeeding wood and eventually succeeded by natural gas.  Wheeling and the surrounding area was part of the Ohio Coal Belt, and coal was mined nearby.

Wheeling is part of the northern strip of West Virginia, located in Ohio County between the states of  Ohio and Pennsylvania.  The city was part of Virginia until 1863, when the state of West Virginia was admitted to the Union during the American Civil War.  The area's excellent transportation infrastructure, which included the National Road and the Ohio River, improved in late December 1852, when the Baltimore and Ohio Railroad reached Wheeling.   More railroads were constructed during the following years, including across the river in Ohio.

Ritchietown and South Wheeling
The independent community of Ritchietown was located south of Wheeling on the Ohio River.  Ritchietown is named after John Ritchie, who along with Samuel Sprigg owned much of the land in the area.  Among John Ritchie's business interests was a glass works, which was started in 1829. The Plunkett and Miller glass works was started in Ritchietown around 1837.  The company had a 10-pot furnace, but was bankrupt after a few years of production.  In 1850, Ritchietown was incorporated, and changed its name to South Wheeling.  The community changed names again in 1870, when it became part of the city of Wheeling as its Eighth Ward.

Startup
In 1845, James B. Barnes and John L. Hobbs moved to the Ohio River community of Ritchietown to start a new glass company named Barnes and Hobbs.  The two men leased the former Plunkett and Miller glass works, which was owned by creditors of the bankrupt firm.  Both men had worked in supervisory positions at the New England Glass Company in Massachusetts.  Their sons, James F. Barnes and John H. Hobbs, joined the business early in its existence.  The glass works consisted of two furnaces with a total of 14 pots.  Coal was available nearby.  Because no railroads had been built east of the Allegany Mountains, the Ohio River and National Road were the major transportation resources.

Name changes

The elder Mr. Barnes died in 1849.  At that time, the company was reorganized as Hobbs, Barnes and Company, with the two Hobbs men and younger Barnes as the owners.  Not only did the glass company change its name, the community where the glass works was located also changed its name.  In 1850, the community of Ritchietown incorporated as South Wheeling.

The expansion of what was, at that time, the American West, increased demand for glassware.  In response, the company built another furnace in 1854.  The firm was again renamed.  The company became Barnes, Hobbs and Company, and was owned by John L. Hobbs, James F. Barnes, John H. Hobbs, and J. K. Dunham.

By 1858, kerosene lamps and lanterns became popular in the United States.  The company began making additional products:  lamps and chimneys (the glass that surrounds the wick of the lamp).   Demand for these products was so strong that the company could not produce enough of them.  The company also changed its name again—this time to Hobbs and Barnes. In addition to its South Wheeling glass works, the firm had an outlet for its products in Wheeling. 
The American Civil War began in 1861, and many employees of the Hobbs and Barnes glass works enlisted in the Union Army.  The furnace of the company's glass works was shut down for about half of the year.  The company continued operations, but had difficulty finding skilled workers.

In 1863, James F. Barnes retired, and the co-partnership of Hobbs and Barnes was dissolved.  A new co-partnership was formed, consisting of John L. Hobbs, John H. Hobbs, and Charles W. Brockunier.  The firm was named J. H. Hobbs, Brockunier and Company.  The newest partner, Charles W. Brockunier began working at the South Wheeling glass works in the 1850s.  He had "superior business abilities" and was also one of West Virginia's pioneers in oil development.  The stated purpose of the new firm was "manufacturing Flint and Fancy Colored Glassware, in all its branches, at the Works, South Wheeling."  The Hobbs and Barnes glassware and china outlet was also renamed.  Another name change occurred later in 1863, when the northwestern portion of Virginia, including Wheeling, became the state of West Virginia.

Golden era

The next twenty-five years were a golden era for the South Wheeling glassworks. The firm became "famous for the variety, quality, and beauty of its pressed ware, and the richness of its cut, engraved and blown ware".  Wheeling became a "hub for chemical and technological improvements to the composition of glass and the development of furnaces, molds, and presses" for making glass.  J. H. Hobbs, Brockunier & Company was the most important glass manufacturer in West Virginia, and one of the most important in the United States.

Glass formula
During early 1863, John L. Hobbs (the elder Hobbs) became convinced that glass made with lime instead of lead would be a better product.  He began testing various combinations of ingredients to make high quality glass without lead, but his experiments were not successful.  In the fall of the same year, William Leighton Sr. joined the firm as a partner, and continued the experiments with lime glass.   Leighton came from a glass making family, and had worked at New England Glass Company.  In 1864, Leighton had success.  His major change in the formula for glass was using bicarbonate of soda instead of soda ash.  His formula was similar to the long-lost soda-lime formula used many years earlier in Europe.  The glass made using this formula had good enough quality that the company could compete in the high-end of the glassware market.

This improvement in the formula for glass was considered one of two great advances in American glassmaking during the 19th century, the other being the invention of pressing.  The ingredients used to make the glass were lower-cost than those used to make lead glass.  In addition, the glass cooled faster, meaning the workforce would press it quicker.  Thus, the new formula produced high-quality glass at lower costs for both ingredients and labor.

Leighton retired in 1868, and was replaced as a partner in the firm by his son, William Leighton Jr.  The elder Leighton already made his mark on the glass industry, as his new recipe for glass caused  glassware to be available to the consumer at about 25 percent of the cost prior to his discovery.   The drop in prices created new demand for glass products—causing new factories to be built and old factories to increase capacity.

1870s
By 1873, the glass works was the oldest in America west of the Allegany Mountains.  Its facilities occupied  square, and had three furnaces with a combined capacity of 29 pots.  Benzine was used as a fuel for the furnace because its lack of sulfur produced clearer glass.  The works employed about 300 people, and its annual revenue was about $325,000 (about $8.1 million in 2013 dollars).

During the rest of the decade, furnaces were rebuilt and capacity was increased to a total of 32 pots.  In 1879, one furnace was converted to gas as its fuel, and was considered the largest in the United States.   About 350 people were employed at the works at that time.  The company's goods were sold on four continents.  Products included "all articles of glass for table use, engraved, cut and etched; bar goods, lamps, chandeliers and epergnes." J. H. Hobbs, Brockunier and Company was the largest glass company in America.

Hobbs, Brockunier and Company
John L. Hobbs died in 1881, and the remaining partners purchased his stake in the firm.  The company was renamed Hobbs, Brockunier and Company.  In the early 1880s, the firm began  making European-style glassware.  By the mid-1880s, it had improved enough on the European designs that European manufacturers began emulating products from Wheeling.  The glass works was shipping about 400 railroad carloads per year.  Sales offices were kept in Boston, New York, Philadelphia, and Baltimore.  Its colored ware was popular, and the works produced more ruby glass than the rest of the nation combined.

Hobbs Glass Company
In 1887, Charles W. Brockunier retired for health reasons, and Hobbs, Brockunier and Company was dissolved.  A new firm, the Hobbs Glass Company, was formed in 1888.  Stockholders elected John H. Hobbs president.  The Board of Directors consisted of Hobbs, Henry Schmulbach, A. J. Clarke, Howard Hazlett, and William Leighton Jr.

Talent provider

The company had a policy of using skilled glassworkers from Europe, who would train the local employees—resulting in a superior workforce.  Former employees of the glass works became the talent that established many of the region's glass factories, and many were company president or plant manager.  Perhaps the one former Hobbs employee that had the biggest influence on the industry was Michael Owens.  Owens revolutionized the glass bottle industry by inventing a machine that would make bottles at high speed and low cost with consistency in size and shape.  Not only did Owens' invention lower costs, it also opened new markets where low cost bottles with consistent size could be used as containers for products that previously had limited distribution.  Owens was also involved with improving a machine for producing window glass, which changed the way window glass was produced.  He was involved with the formation of the Toledo Glass Company, the Owens Bottle Machine Company, and the Libbey-Owens Sheet Glass Company.

An early example of the Hobbs talent flow is the Belmont Glass Company, which began production during the 1860s.   John Robinson, Charles Henry Over, and Henry Crimmel were former Hobbs and Barnes workers involved with the startup. Robinson and Over were on the company's board of directors, and Robinson was plant superintendent.  Robinson and Over were also among the founders of the Bellaire Goblet Company in 1876.  Years later (in 1888), Charles Henry Over founded the C. H. Over Glass Company.  In 1893, John Robinson started the Robinson Glass Company.  Henry Crimmel moved to Fostoria in 1887 to help with the startup of the Fostoria Glass Company.  Crimmel owned a share of the company, and Crimmel glass recipes are thought to have been used by the company early in its existence.  Crimmel was also a founder of the Novelty Glass Company and the reorganized version of the Sneath Glass Company.

Another example of Hobbs worker talent is the Fostoria Glass Company, which was incorporated in 1887 by a group that included former Hobbs and Brockunier employees Lucien B. Martin, William S. Brady, James B. Russell, and Otto Jaeger.  Martin was president, and Brady Vice President.  Brady also became involved with the Fostoria Shade and Lamp Company.  That company hired former Hobbs worker Nicholas Kopp, who became internationally known for his skill with colored glass and design work.  When the Seneca Glass Company began operations in Fostoria, Ohio, in 1892, its first president was former Hobbs and Fostoria executive Otto Jaeger.  Later Jaeger founded Bonita Art Glass in Wheeling.

Decline
The economy and labor difficulties led to the eventual closing of the Hobbs Glass Company.  In addition, the plant's infrastructure was old.   A fire damaged the facility in 1890, causing $30,000 (nearly $780,000 in 2013 dollars)  in damages.

U.S. Glass
  In 1891, a glass trust was formed in Harrisburg, Pennsylvania.  The new firm was named United States Glass Company, and John H. Hobbs was on the board of directors.  Initially, the Pittsburgh-based company consisted of 16 unionized glass works.   Each factory became known by a letter (e.g. Factory A of United States Glass Company).   Hobbs Glass Company became Factory H.  Within the next year, representatives of the trust evaluated the 16 glass works.  Factory H was thought to be old, have high expenses, and produce products that were costly to make.  In addition, the process for making many of Factory H's products could not be easily mechanized.

The United States was in an economic recession at the time of the formation of the glass trust.  From management's point of view, United States Glass Company had been formed with the intention of making the unionized companies competitive with the non-union companies.  Two ways to make the plants more competitive were to get concessions from the unions and to introduce more machines.  From the point of view of the glass workers' union, United States Glass Company "took advantage of the hard times and slack business to get rid of the union."

The reality of the situation was the U.S. Glass trust was formed to "oppose the union and to introduce the automated equipment."  The American Flint Glass Workers' Union was naturally opposed to mechanization or concessions, and it was strong enough that a single glass works could not oppose it.  U.S. Glass built two large works (Gas City, Indiana and Glassport, Pennsylvania) that were highly automated—and could oppose unions at the other 16 plants.   During the summer of 1892, workers at Factory H were notified that after the summer shutdown, their jobs would be vacant.  Those that desired to work at the plant would need to apply to the new factory manager.  On October 12, 1893, the American Flint Glass Workers  began a strike.  Glass was not produced at Factory H, although inventory was still being sold.  In January 1894 U.S. Glass proposed that if the workers at its Wheeling plants would accept the terms of the labor agreements used in its Pittsburgh plants, work would start immediately.  If the conditions were not accepted, then Wheeling's two glass works (including Factory H) would be torn down.  The union rejected the proposed terms.  Members of the union remained on strike until 1897.  U.S. Glass survived by producing glass at its two large (and recently built) highly mechanized plants.

Northwood
Factory H was not torn down, and U.S. Glass was still maintaining the facility in early 1895.  In 1902, the plant was sold to Harry Northwood.  Northwood was an Englishman that worked at Hobbs, Brockunier and Company as an etcher in the 1880s.  The company showcased his work at the West Virginia State Fair in 1882, which included etched pitchers and wine glasses.  Northwood was considered "one of the leading glassmen of this country".  His new glass works was H. Northwood and Company.  The plant employed 300 people, and became well known for table ware.  Northwood died in 1919, and his company closed in 1925.  That was the end of glassmaking at the Wheeling glass works originally known as Barnes and Hobbs, and more famous as J. H. Hobbs, Brockunier, and Company.

Notes and references
Notes

References

Cited works

External links

The Museum of American Glass in West Virginia

Glassmaking companies of the United States
Defunct glassmaking companies
Companies based in Wheeling, West Virginia
Manufacturing companies established in 1845
1845 establishments in Virginia
1890s disestablishments in West Virginia
American companies established in 1845
American companies disestablished in 1891
Manufacturing companies disestablished in 1891
Defunct manufacturing companies based in West Virginia